The Jarbidge Wilderness is a wilderness area located in the Jarbidge Mountains of northern Elko County in northeastern Nevada, United States. It is contained within the Jarbidge Ranger District of the Humboldt-Toiyabe National Forest.

"Jarbidge" is a name derived from the Shoshone language meaning "devil". Indians believed the hills in the area were haunted.

Geography
The original Jarbidge Wilderness was established by the 1964 Wilderness Act, and was the first wilderness area protected in Nevada.

The wilderness area contains the headwaters of both the Marys and Jarbidge Rivers, and of Salmon Falls Creek. Emerald and Jarbidge Lakes are also within its boundaries.

Native habitats include Subalpine Fir, Whitebark Pine, and Quaking Aspen forests, riparian woodlands, and sagebrush steppe.

See also 
 Jarbidge, Nevada
 Bruneau – Jarbidge Rivers Wilderness
 List of wilderness areas in Nevada

References

External links 
 
 Humboldt-Toiyabe National Forest.gov: official Jarbidge Wilderness webpage
 Wilderness.net: Jarbidge Wilderness
 IdahoSummits.com: Jarbidge Wilderness

Wilderness areas of Nevada
Humboldt–Toiyabe National Forest
Protected areas of Elko County, Nevada
Protected areas established in 1964
1964 establishments in Nevada
IUCN Category Ib